Alan W. Heldman (born 1962) is an American interventional cardiologist. Heldman graduated from Harvard College, University of Alabama School of Medicine, and completed residency and fellowship training at Johns Hopkins University School of Medicine.  He held positions on the faculty of Johns Hopkins from 1995 to 2007. In 2007, he became clinical chief of cardiology at the University of Miami's Leonard M. Miller School of Medicine.

He published one of the first studies showing that a drug-coated stent (now known as a drug-eluting stent) could prevent restenosis.  His research interests include delivery of stem cells to the heart for repair of myocardial infarction. He is the principal investigator for a Phase I-II clinical trial of stem cell therapy for patients with left ventricular dysfunction after myocardial infarction.

His clinical interests include high risk and complex coronary intervention, treatment of hypertrophic cardiomyopathy, including with alcohol septal ablation, non-surgical treatments for valvular and structural heart disease, and strategies to eliminate complications from interventional cardiology procedures.

He was engaged to Chinese-Malaysian actress Michelle Yeoh from 1998 to 2000.

References

External links
New Beat, All Heart
Resuscitation from Right Ventricular Infarction

1962 births
Living people
American cardiologists
Harvard College alumni
Johns Hopkins University alumni
Johns Hopkins University faculty
Physicians from Birmingham, Alabama
University of Alabama School of Medicine alumni
University of Miami faculty